Barbara Wiesława Hermel-Niemczyk (born 13 November 1942) is a former Polish volleyball player, a member of Poland women's national volleyball team in 1964–1976, a bronze medalist of the Olympic Games (Tokyo 1964, Mexico 1968), medalist of the European Championship (silver in 1967, bronze in 1971, five-time Polish Champion (1968, 1971,1972, 1973, 1976), Italian Champion (1977).

Personal life
She was married to Andrzej Niemczyk - head coach, who led Polish women's national volleyball team to two titles of European Champions (2003, 2005). They have daughter Małgorzata Niemczyk (born 1969), who was also volleyball player, European Champion 2003 .

External links
 

1942 births
Living people
Sportspeople from Łódź
Sportspeople from Łódź Voivodeship
Polish women's volleyball players
Olympic volleyball players of Poland
Volleyball players at the 1964 Summer Olympics
Volleyball players at the 1968 Summer Olympics
Olympic bronze medalists for Poland
Olympic medalists in volleyball
Medalists at the 1968 Summer Olympics
Medalists at the 1964 Summer Olympics